People's Council elections were held in Turkmenistan on 28 March 2021 to elect 48 of the 56 members of the People's Council or Halk Maslahaty. Another eight were appointed by the president on 14 April 2021.

Background 
No election held since the country's independence from the Soviet Union has been judged to be free or fair, and international media often refer to Turkmenistan as an autocracy with a rubber-stamp parliament.

Following constitutional amendments in September 2020, the unicameral 125-seat Assembly was replaced by the bicameral National Council (Milli Geňeş) with the Assembly (Mejlis) becoming the lower house and the 56-seat People's Council (Halk Maslahaty) becoming the upper house. Foreign policy analysts linked the changes with President Berdimuhamedow smoothening avenues for an upcoming transfer of power to his son.

Electoral system
Councils of the five provinces (welaýat) and the capital city (şäher) nominated eight members each, while the remaining eight members were to be appointed by the president. To be nominated as a member, one had to be a citizen of Turkmenistan above 30 years of age with a minimum educational qualification of graduation and have permanent residence status for the previous ten years, with no active criminal proceedings.

The 15-member Central Election Commission—established in 2019 by a presidential decree as an "independent organ of the state"—was tasked with overseeing the entire process, with aid from provincial election commissions.

Candidates
Nominations ran from 6 February to 2 March. 112 candidates—21 from Ahal province, 21 from Balkan province, 18 from Dashoguz province, 18 from Lebap province, 17 from Mary Province, and 17 from Ashgabat—entered the race. 83 were men and 29 women. 

Biographic sketches of all candidates were broadcast in Turkmen mass media by the first week of March. Most were civil servants. Campaigning was permitted until 26 March.

Conduct
Each province (and the capital) was assigned a single voting center. Polling was open from 09:00 to 23:00 on 28 March; the entrance area was livestreamed on the website of the Election Commission for the entire duration.

Candidates were styled as "Family name, First name, Patronymic", and sorted alphabetically in the ballot; age, occupation, place of residence, and place of work were also mentioned. Out of the 231 councillors, who registered as voters, 228 took part.

Observers
The Election Commission claimed to have appointed 440 observers—420 from the six approved political parties, 20 from civil society organizations, and 20 candidate-proxies—for "increasing transparency" of the election. Foreign observers were not allowed.

Results 
Ballots were counted, and results declared the next morning. The following candidates were elected:

Twenty-seven percent of the winning candidates were women. Berdimuhamedow was alleged to have received 100% of the vote.

Aftermath
On 14 April 2021, the People's Council held its first session. Berdimuhamedow inaugurated the complex, addressed the winners, and went on to appoint eight more members. Thereafter, the Council Chair and Deputy Chair were elected. Also elected were the Chairs and Deputy Chairs of five House Committees.

See also
Assembly of Turkmenistan
National Council of Turkmenistan
People's Council of Turkmenistan
Politics of Turkmenistan

Notes

References

Elections in Turkmenistan
Turkmenistan
2021 in Turkmenistan
Political history of Turkmenistan